Blazegraph is an open source triplestore and graph database, developed by Systap, which is used in the Wikidata SPARQL endpoint and by other large customers. It is licensed under the GNU GPL (version 2).

Amazon acquired the Blazegraph developers and the Blazegraph open source development was essentially stopped in April 2018.

Early history 

The system was first known as Bigdata. Since release of version 1.5 (12 February 2015), it is named Blazegraph.

Prominent users 

 The Wikimedia Foundation uses Blazegraph for the Wikidata Query Service, which is a SPARQL endpoint.
 The Datatourisme project uses Blazegraph as the database platform; however, GraphQL is used as the query language instead of SPARQL.

Notable features 

 RDF* — an alternative approach to RDF reification, which gives RDF graphs capabilities of  graphs;
 as the consequence of the previous, ability of querying graphs both in SPARQL and Gremlin;
 as an alternative to Gremlin querying,  abstraction over RDF graphs support in SPARQL;
 The SERVICE syntax of federated queries for functionality extending;
 Managed behavior of the query plan generator;
  Reusable named subqueries.

Acqui-hiring by Amazon Web Service (AWS) 

It was alleged
that Amazon Neptune is based on Blazegraph, as evidenced by:
 acquiring of the Blazegraph trademark by AWS;
 acquiring of the blazegraph.com domain name by AWS;
 transition of many employees (including CEO) to AWS.

References

External links 
 
 Page on DB-Engines.com

Graph databases
Triplestores
Semantic Web